Philippe Baqué is a French journalist and documentary filmmaker.  He is known for his criticism of industrialization of agricultural techniques, and particularly of the "bio" industry.

Career

Between 1987 and 1997 Philippe Baqué wrote for journals such as Le Monde diplomatique, Politis, Nouveau Politis, Témoignage chrétien, Campagne solidaire, Faim développement magazine, Maintenant and Cahiers de l'Iremam.
From 1992 to 2003 he also worked on investigations for audio-visual documentaries.
In 1999 he published the book Un nouvel or noir, ou le pillage des objets d'art en Afrique (A new black gold, or the looting of art in Africa).
He has since written investigative reporting articles on this subject.
In 2003 he was a contributing journalist for Le Monde Diplomatique.

Philippe Baqué was project coordinator for the book De la bio alternative aux dérives du « bio »-business, quel sens donner à la bio ? (organic alternative to the excesses of the "bio"-business).
This was sponsored by the Alterravia association and supported by Nature-et-Progrès, la Confédération paysanne, Minga and the Forum civique européen.
This work pulls together writings by different authors on the damage caused by the bio business.  Baqué had become interested in the subject with his 2001 documentary ""Eldorado de plastique" about Andalusia, and with subsequent research in Brazil and Colombia.
In February 2011 Philippe Baqué published an article, L’industrialisation du bio (the industrialization of "bio") that took a global view of the industry and claimed that industrial techniques were doing great harm.

Filmography
A partial list of documentaries:

Bibliography

References

Living people
French journalists
French male non-fiction writers
Year of birth missing (living people)